Manganese chloride may refer to:

 Manganese(II) chloride (manganous chloride, manganese dichloride), MnCl2, stable pink solid
 Manganese(III) chloride (manganic chloride, manganese trichloride), MnCl3, hypothetical chemical compound